The following is a list of female footballers who received the Best Female Football Player of the Year Award.

Albania 

Association: Federata Shqiptare e Futbollit (FSHF)

Founded in 2009, the National Championship is the highest division of women's football in Albania. Currently there are 11 teams competing in this domestic competition. The Albanian Women's National Team was formed in 2011 and made its debut in a friendly match against F.Y.R. Macedonia. The match was won by Albania 1-0.

No awards are currently given in women's football.

Andorra 

Association: Federació Andorrana de Futbol (FAF)

Currently there is no domestic competition in Andorra. The Andorran National Team took part in the preliminary round of the qualifications for the 2019 FIFA Women's World Cup to be held in France.

No awards are currently given in women's football.

Armenia 

Association: Հայաստանի Ֆուտբոլի Ֆեդերացիա (FFA)

After the split from the Soviet Union, Armenia played its first international match in May 2003 in and against Austria, losing 11-0. Today only a U19 team is active at international level, and it is ranked at 139th place by FIFA. Currently Armenia has a domestic competition of nine teams competing in two national divisions (Women Football championship Group A and Group B).

No awards are currently given in women's football.

Austria 

Association: Österreichischer Fußball-Bund (ÖFB)

Award: Fußballerin des Jahres

The Austrian National Team started playing in July 1970. Their first match was against Mexico, and they lost 9-0. Austria made its international competitive debut in the 1970 Women's World Cup - an unofficial competition held in Italy.

Founded in 1973, the ÖFB-Frauenliga is the top level competition in Austrian women's domestic football.

Austria was among the first countries in Europe to launch a "Player of the Year" award for women's football. The trophy is awarded to the best (Austrian) player active in the ÖFB-Frauenliga. The first award was won by Renate Seidl (ESV Ostbahn XI Wien) in 1983.

Azerbaijan

Association: Azərbaycan Futbol Federasiyaları Assosiasiyası (AFFA)

Azerbaijan does not have a domestic football competition for women. There is an Azerbaijani National Team, although it is an U-21 team according to the official website of the AFFA.

No awards are currently given in women's football.

Belarus 

Association: Беларуская Федэрацыя Футбола (BFF)

The Premier League is the top level domestic competition in Belarus played with 7 teams. Belarus first time appearance at international level was in the 1997 UEFA Women's Euro Qualification stage. In their first official international match they lost 1-0 to the Czech Republic.

No awards are currently given in women's football.

Belgium

Association: Koninklijke Belgische Voetbalbond (KBVB) / Union royale belge des sociétés de football association (URBSFA) / Königlicher Belgischer Fußballverband (KBFV)

Award: Gouden Schoen / Soulier d'Or

Belgium made its international debut against France in May 1976, winning 2-1. Today the Super League Vrouwenvoetbal is the highest division in Belgian women's football with 7 teams. Belgium also has a 1e Klasse / Division I - 2e Klasse A / Division II A - 2e Klasse B / Division II B each played with 14 teams of which some are secondary teams of clubs playing in the Super League. Earlier forms of domestic competition were the BeNe League, which was a joint competition with The Netherlands from 2012 - 2015. Before the BeNe League the competition in Belgium was classified as "Lagere Klassen"  or lower class or amateur football.

In 2017 the first official Gouden Schoen / Soulier d'Or was awarded for the Best Belgian Female Player of the year playing either domestically or abroad. In 2015 the Sparkle award was introduced in protest at the Belgian Football Association not having an award equivalent to men's.

1 BeNe League Bottega Player of the year (joined award Belgium & Netherlands)

2 The Sparkle is an award for the best female soccer player comparable to the Belgian Golden Shoe for men, awarded by the BFC (Belgian Football coaches), Super League Vrouwenvoetbal and the city of Ostend

3 Belgian Golden Shoe

Bosnia and Herzegovina

Association: Nogometni/Fudbalski Savez Bosne i Hercegovine (N/FSBiH) / Ногоʍєmɴн/Фудбалски Савез Босне и Херцеговине (Н/ФСБиХ)

Award: Idol Nacije

The Premier League (Ženska Premijer Liga BiH) is the highest division in Bosnian women's football and is played with 8 teams. Founded in its current form in 2013, it is one of the most recent women's leagues in Europe. Being a part of the former Yugoslav countries, Bosnia & Herzegovina made its first independent international appearance in September 1997 in and against Slovakia. A game they lost 11-0.

Bosnia & Herzegovina is - at this time - about the only former Yugoslavian country to award the best female football player. Lidija Kuliš (SFK 2000 Sarajevo) was the first to receive this award in 2008.

Bulgaria 

Association: Български футболен съюз (БФС) / Bŭlgarski futbolen sŭyuz (BFU)

Award: Футболист №1 на България / Futbolist №1 na Balgariya

The Bulgarian national championship of women's football (Държавно първенство жени) is the top level league in Bulgaria. Founded in 1985, it is played with 8 teams. Bulgaria made its debut at international level in October 1987 where they drew (1-1) against Spain.

In 2015 Bulgaria launched an award for the best female football player of the year. The first winner was Silvia Radoyska who, at that time, played on loan for Spanish club Sporting de Huelva.

Croatia 

Association: Hrvatski nogometni savez (HNS)

Founded in 1992, the 1. HNLŽ (Prva hrvatska nogometna liga za žene) is the top level of women's football in Croatia and is played with 10 teams. Since its independence from Yugoslavia in 1991, Croatia made its debut in a friendly against Slovenia. They lost the match 3-2.

No awards are currently given in women's football.

Cyprus 

Association: Cyprus Football Association (CFA) / Κυπριακή Ομοσπονδία Ποδοσφαίρου (ΚΟΠ)

The Cypriot First Division is the top division of women's football in Cyprus. It has been running since its establishment during the 1998-1999 season and has since played with 9 teams. Cyprus played its first international match in April 2002 when they received Greece for a neighbour friendly. The match was won by the Greece 2-4.

No awards are currently given in women's football.

Czech Republic 

Association: Fotbalová asociace České republiky (FAČR)

Award: Fotbalistka roku

The I. liga žen is the top level women's football league of the Czech Republic and is played with 8 teams. After the split of Czechoslovakia in 1993, the Czech National Team played its first international friendly against former compatriot Slovakia, beating them 6-0.

The award for best player of the year was introduced in 2002. First to win was Kateřina Došková of AC Sparta Praha.

Denmark 

Association: Dansk Boldspil-Union (DBU)

Award:dansk fodbold award

Elitedivisionen is the highest level league in Denmark women's football, founded in 1973 and today played with 6 teams. Denmark made its international debut against Sweden in July 1974, a match they won 1-0.

In 2000 the first Player of the year award for women was introduced. Gitte Krogh (Odense Boldklub) was the first to win this award.

England 

Association: English Football Association (FA)

Award: PFA Women's Players' Player of the Year

Women's football in England is played on 10 different levels of which the Women's Super League 1 & Women's Super League 2, played with 10 teams each, are the highest levels. England made its debut on the international scene in November 1972. They concluded their first match in and against Scotland with a 2-3 win.

The PFA Women's Players' Player of the Year award was introduced in 2013 and is only 1 of 3 official awards to be won in English women's football. The first player to win this award was Scottish International Kim Little (Arsenal L.F.C.). Other awards in English women's football: FA WSL 1 Players' Player of the Year award, Vauxhall England Women's Player of the Year award

1 FA WSL 1 Players' Player of the Year award

2 Vauxhall England Women's Player of the Year award

3 PFA Women's Players' Player of the Year award

Estonia 

Association: Eesti Jalgpalli Liit (EJL)

Award: Estonian Female Footballer of the Year

Naiste Meistriliiga is the highest division in women's domestic football in Estonia. Founded in 1994 this league is played with 8 teams. Estonia made its debut in and against Lithuania in June 1994. They lost 3-0.

An award for the best Estonian Footballer of the Year has been issued since 1994 and was first awarded to Aire Lepik (Viljandi JK Tulevik). From 2009 the best player in the Naiste Meistriliiga is honoured. First to win this award was Russian national Svetlana Khvatova (FC Levadia Tallinn).

1 Naiste Meistriliiga Player of the Season

Europe (UEFA) 

Association: Union of European Football Associations (UEFA)

Award: UEFA Best Women's Player in Europe Award

F.Y.R. Macedonia 

Association: Фудбалска Федерација на Македонија (ФФМ) / Fudbalska Federacija na Makedonija (FFM)

Award: Macedonian Footballer of the Year

The 1. лига - Жени (1st women's league) is the top-level women's league in Macedonia. Active since 2001, it is played with 9 teams. Macedonia made its official debut at international level in May 2005. In their first game they lost 4-0 to Croatia.

Little information is currently available relating to the Player of the Year award for women, and it is believed that the award was not formalised until 2013. First to have won the prize was Sirieta Brahimi in 2004.

Faroe Islands 

Association: Fótbóltssamband Føroya (FSF)

1. deild kvinnur (1st division women) is the top level women's football league of the Faroe Islands and is played with 6 teams. In September 1995 the Faroe Islands women's national football team made its first official appearance in a friendly against Ireland which they lost 0-2. Nine years earlier, in June 1986, the Faroe Islands had an unofficial match with Iceland. Iceland won 6-0.

No awards for best player are currently given in women's football although there is an award for top scorer of the year which was established in 1989.

Finland 

Association: Suomen Palloliitto (SPL) / Finlands Bollförbund (FBF)

Award: Jalkapalloilija vuoden

The Naisten Liiga / Damligan is the premier division in Finnish women's football. Under its new form (established in 2006) the competition is played with 11 teams. In their debut match in August 1973 Finland drew with Sweden.

In Finland the first Female player of the year award was introduced in 1976. Merja Sjöman (Turun Palloseura) was the first winner.

France 

Association: Fédération Française de Football (FFF)

Award: Trophées UNFP du football

Between 1918 and 1932 the FSFSF Championship existed in France. In recent history the Division 1 Féminine is the highest division in women's football. Founded in 1974, it exists today of 12 teams. In the past 10 years the competition has been dominated by Olympique Lyonnais. France made its international debut in October 1920 against England, winning 2-0.

The Trophée UNFP was first awarded in women's football in 2001. The first winner was Anne Zenoni (Toulouse FC).

Georgia 

Association: საქართველოს ფეხბურთის ფედერაცია (GFF)

The Georgian Women's League was founded in 2014 and is currently played with 6 teams. Georgia made its debut in the qualification stage for UEFA Women's Euro 1997 losing to Yugoslavia 11-0.

No awards are currently given in women's football.

Germany 

Association: Deutscher Fußball-Bund (DFB)

Award: Fußballerin des Jahres

Since 1990 (after the reunification of East and West Germany) the 1.Frauen-Bundesliga is the main competition in Germany. It was first played in North- and South-divisions, and in 1997 the groups were merged to form a uniform league with 12 teams. The first appearance of the Deutsche Fußballnationalmannschaft der Frauen can be split in two... East and West. While West Germany made a promising start in November 1982 against Switzerland with a 5-1 win, the East German team only appeared once in May 1990 which resulted in a 0-3 defeat against Czechoslovakia.

The award Fußballerin des Jahres was introduced in 1996. First winner was Martina Voss (FC Rumeln-Kaldenhausen) who is currently  head coach of Switzerland (W).

1 "Nationalspielerin des Jahres": Player of the year in the National team

Gibraltar 

Association: Gibraltar Football Association (GFA)

The Premier League is the top level amateur women's league in Gibraltar which is played with 5 teams, and played with 9 players per side. At the moment there is no Women's National Team active.

No awards are currently given in women's football.

Greece 

Association: Hellenic Football Federation (HFF) / Ελληνική Ποδοσφαιρική Ομοσπονδία (ΕΠΟ)

The Pan-Hellenic Women's Football Championship (Πανελλήνιο Πρωτάθλημα Γυναικών) or "Women's Alpha Ethniki" was founded in 1987 and is the highest professional women's football league in Greece. The competition is played with 9 teams. Greece made its debut in July 1991 against Italy losing 6-0.

No awards are currently given in women's football.

Hungary

Association: Magyar Labdarúgó Szövetség (MLSZ)

Award: Az év magyar labdarúgója Nők

The Női NB I ("Női Nemzeti Bajnokság" or "women's national championship") is the top level league in women's football in Hungary. Founded in 1984, the competition is played with 8 teams. Hungary played its first international match in April 1985 against West Germany and lost 1-0.

In 1985 the MLSZ launched the Az év magyar labdarúgója Nők, an award given to the best female Hungarian footballer playing either domestically or abroad. The first player to win the award was Imréné Matskássy (Renova FC).

Iceland

Association: Knattspyrnusamband Íslands (KSÍ)

Award: Knattspyrnukona ársins

The Úrvalsdeild kvenna is the premier division of the Icelandic women's football league. Founded in 1972, it is now played with 10 teams. In September 1981, Iceland made its debut against Scotland losing 3-2.

The knattspyrnumaður og knattspyrnukona ársins award was introduced in 1973. Between 1973-1996 this award could be won by both male and female players. In 1994 was Ásta Breiðfjörð Gunnlaugsdóttir (Breiðablik UBK) was the first woman to win the award. In 1997 the awards for best male and female player were split. Guðrún Jóna Kristjánsdóttir (Knattspyrnufélag Reykjavíkur) was the winner of the new award.

1 (1973-1996) Initially, the award could have been given to both male and female players. Ásta Breiðfjörð Gunnlaugsdóttir won in 1994, and this was the first and only time a woman won the award. In 1997, the award was split into men and women's categories.

Ireland

Association: Women's Football Association of Ireland (WFAI)

Award: FAI Senior Women's International Player of the Year

The Women's National league (WNL) or "Sraith Náisiúnta na mBan" is the top level women's league in the Irish Republic. Founded as "Ladies League of Ireland" in 1973, the domestic competition was reformed in 2011 and is now played with 7 teams. The Irish National Team made its first appearance in April 1973 against Scotland losing 10-1.

The FAI Senior Women's International Player of the Year was first awarded in 1997. Bernie Reilly (Shamrock Rovers F.C.) was the first winner.

Israel

Association: Israel Football Association (IFA) / ההתאחדות לכדורגל בישראל

The Ligat Nashim (ליגת נשים) is the Israeli women's league and was founded in 1998. The league is divided in two divisions. The Women's Premier league (Ligat Nashim Rishona) which is played with 9 teams, and the Second Women's League (Ligat Nashim Shniya) played by a variable number of teams depending on registration. The Israeli women's national football team first appeared in 1970 with domestic clubs being formed in the years following. Israels' first official match was played in August 1977, in which they were defeated 12-0 in and against The Netherlands.

No awards are currently given in women's football.

Italy

Association: Federazione Italiana Giuoco Calcio (FIGC)

Award: Calciatrice dell'anno

The Serie A is the highest-level league competition for women in Italy. Founded in 1968, the league is played with 12 teams. Italy made its debut in international football in February 1968 winning 2-1 against Czechoslovakia.

The Calciatrice dell'anno is a yearly award which was first introduced in 2012. The first winner Melania Gabbiadini (A.S.D. AGSM Verona F.C.) has won the award four times in a row, and is thus the only winner so far.

Latvia

Moldova

Netherlands 

1 BeNe League Bottega Player of the year (joined award Belgium & Netherlands)

Norway 

1 (1990–present) The award could have been given to both male and female players.

Sweden

Switzerland

Wales

References 

Albania: https://web.archive.org/web/20170212085501/http://www.fshf.org/index.php/en/women-football/women-national-team
Andorra: http://www.faf.ad/pnfg/NPortada?CodPortada=1000163
Armenia: http://www.ffa.am/en/1417609200
Austria: https://web.archive.org/web/20130705132647/http://www.oefb.at/frauenfussball-pid565
Azerbaijan: http://www.affa.az/index.php?lang=2
Belarus: http://abff.by/index.php?option=com_sport&task=players&team_id=35&Itemid=1003&lang=ru
Belgium: http://www.belgianfootball.be/nl/homepage
Bosnia & Herzegovina: https://web.archive.org/web/20170216125117/http://nfsbih.ba/bih/index.php
Bulgaria: https://web.archive.org/web/20161202090440/http://bfunion.bg/en/
Croatia: http://hns-cff.hr/en/
Cyprus: https://web.archive.org/web/20170606151831/http://www.cfa.com.cy/En
Czech Republic: https://facr.fotbal.cz/
Denmark: http://www.dbu.dk/#OhzEeFDxY50l55iF.97
England: http://www.thefa.com/
Estonia: http://www.jalgpall.ee/
Europe (Uefa): http://www.uefa.com/
F.Y.R.Macedonia: http://ffm.mk/en ; http://macedonianfootball.com/index.php?option=com_content&view=category&id=1&Itemid=63
Faroe Islands: http://www.fsf.fo/Default.aspx?ID=1  ; http://www.faroesoccer.com/read.php?page=530
Finland: https://www.palloliitto.fi/
France: https://www.fff.fr/
Georgia: http://gff.ge/en/
Germany: https://www.dfb.de/start/ ; https://www.dfb.de/news/detail/kerschowski-ist-nationalspielerin-des-jahres-damit-habe-ich-nicht-gerechnet-160517/
Gibraltar: http://www.gibraltarfa.com/
Greece: http://www.epo.gr/Home.aspx?a_id=256
Hungary: http://en.mlsz.hu/
Iceland: https://web.archive.org/web/20140625131035/http://www.ksi.is/
Ireland: http://www.fai.ie/
Israel: https://web.archive.org/web/20080502020719/http://eng.football.org.il/Association/AboutAssociation/Pages/default.aspx
Italy: http://www.figc.it/index_en.shtml

European football trophies and awards